Pforzheim is a city of over 125,000 inhabitants in the federal state of Baden-Württemberg, in the southwest of Germany. 

It is known for its jewelry and watch-making industry, and as such has gained the nickname "Goldstadt" ("Golden City"). It marks the frontier between Baden and Württemberg, being located on Baden territory. From 1535-65, it was the home to the Margraves of Baden-Pforzheim.

The City of Pforzheim does not belong to any administrative district (Kreis), although it hosts the administrative offices of the Enz district that surrounds the town.

During World War II, Pforzheim was bombed by the Allies a number of times. The largest raid, and one of the most devastating area bombardments of World War II, was carried out by the Royal Air Force (RAF) on the evening of 23 February 1945.

Nearly one third of the town's population, 17,600 people, were killed in the air raid, and about 83% of the town's buildings were destroyed. The Allies believed that precision instruments were being produced here for use in the German war effort and that the town was a transport centre for the movement of German troops.

The story of the bombardment is dramatically recounted in the history by Giles Milton, titled Wolfram: The Boy Who Went To War (2011).

From 1945 to 1948, Pforzheim (after the initial French occupation) was administered by the United States military and was part of the then-new state of Württemberg-Baden.

In the twenty years following the end of the war, Pforzheim was gradually rebuilt. The town reflects the architecture of the postwar period and has some landmark buildings of the 1950s.

Geography

Pforzheim is located at the northern rim of the eastern part of the Black Forest (Schwarzwald) and the rim of the hilly country of the Kraichgau, in an open valley at the confluences of the rivers Würm and Nagold and the rivers Nagold and Enz. Due to its location, this city is also called the "three-valleys town" (Drei-Täler Stadt) or the "Gateway to the Black Forest" (Pforte zum Schwarzwald / Porta Hercynia).

Pforzheim and its surrounding area belongs to the "Densely Populated Area Karlsruhe/Pforzheim". Pforzheim has the functions of a regional center (Mittelzentrum) for the towns and municipalities Birkenfeld (Enz), Eisingen, Engelsbrand, Friolzheim, Heimsheim, Ispringen, Kämpfelbach, Keltern, Kieselbronn, Königsbach-Stein, Mönsheim, Neuenbürg, Neuhausen, Neulingen, Niefern-Öschelbronn, Ölbronn-Dürrn, Remchingen, Straubenhardt, Tiefenbronn, Wiernsheim, Wimsheim and Wurmberg.

Neighbouring communities
The following towns and communities share borderlines with the City of Pforzheim. Below they are mentioned in clockwise order, beginning to the north of the city. Except for Unterreichenbach, which belongs to the district of Calw, all of them are included in the Enz district.

Ispringen, Neulingen, Kieselbronn, Niefern-Öschelbronn, Wurmberg, Wimsheim, Friolzheim, Tiefenbronn, Neuhausen (Enz), Unterreichenbach, Engelsbrand, Birkenfeld (Enz), Keltern and Kämpfelbach.

City wards
The city of Pforzheim consists of 16 city wards. The communities Büchenbronn, Eutingen an der Enz, Hohenwart, Huchenfeld and Würm, which by way of the latest regional administrative reform during the 1970s were incorporated into Pforzheim's administration, are represented by independent community councils and community administrations according to § 8 and following paragraphs of the main city-ordinance of Pforzheim.

In important matters concerning any of these communities the opinions of the respective community councils must be taken into consideration. However, final decisions on the matter will be made by the Pforzheim city council.
 City center (Innenstadt)
 Northern ward (Nordstadt)
 Eastern ward (Oststadt)
 Southeastern ward (Südoststadt)
 Southwestern ward (Südweststadt)
 Western ward (Weststadt)
 Arlinger
 Brötzingen
 Buckenberg and Hagenschiess; including Altgefaell, Haidach and Wald-Siedlung
 Büchenbronn including Sonnenberg
 Sonnenhof
 Dillweißenstein
 Eutingen an der Enz including Mäuerach
 Hohenwart
 Huchenfeld
 Würm

Climate

History

It was settled by the Romans earlier than the current centers of Stuttgart and Karlsruhe were. These colonists constructed a ford through the river, shortly past the confluence of the three rivers, for their military highway. Due to this strategic location, Pforzheim later became a center for the timber-rafting trade, which transported timber from the Black Forest via the rivers Wuerm, Nagold, Enz and down the Neckar and Rhine to, among other markets, the Netherlands for use in shipbuilding. Their timbers were also used to construct the foundations for Amsterdam, which was built in a swamp.

Since 90: A settlement was established by Roman citizens at the Enz River near the modern Altstädter Brücke (old town bridge). Archeological surveys have unearthed several artifacts of that period which are kept and displayed in the Kappelhof Museum. The settlement was located where the Roman military road connecting the military camp Argentoratum (nowadays Strasbourg in France) and the military camp at Cannstatt (now a suburb of Stuttgart) at the Upper Germanic Limes border line of the Roman Empire crossed the Enz river.

This place was known as Portus (meaning "river crossing, harbor"), which is believed to be the origin of the first part of the city's name "Pforzheim". A Roman milestone (the so-called 'Leugenstein') from the year 245 was excavated in modern times at present-day Friolzheim; it is marked with the exact distance to 'Portus' and is the first documented evidence of the settlement.

259/260: The Roman settlement 'Portus' was destroyed completely, as the Frank and Alemanni tribes overran the Upper Germanic Limes border line of the Roman Empire and conquered the Roman administered area west of the Rhine River. From then on, over an extended period of time, historical records about the settlement were not available.

6th/7th century: Graves from this period indicate that the settlement had been continued.

1067: The settlement was mentioned as "Phorzheim" for the first time, in a document by Henry IV, Holy Roman Emperor. Visits to Pforzheim by Heinrich IV in 1067 and 1074 are documented.

Before 1080: The "old town" of Pforzheim was awarded market rights (Marktrecht). At that time Pforzheim belonged to the estate of Hirsau Monastery, according to monastery documents.

From 1150: Establishment of the "new town" west of the "old town" at the foot of the Schlossberg (palais hill) under Margrave Hermann V.

1200: The town charter of the "new town" was mentioned for the first time in a document. The "old town" continued to exist as a legally independent entity.

1220: The Margraves of Baden selected Pforzheim as their residence. This resulted in the "new town" becoming prominent.

1240: A mayor of Pforzheim was mentioned in a document for the first time.

13th/14th century: Pforzheim enjoyed its first period of flourishing. A group of influential patricians emerged. They developed the financial markets of those days. The town drew its income from the wood trade, timber rafting, the tannery trade, textile manufacturing, and other crafts. Documents mention mayor, judge, council and citizens.

The town walls surrounding the new town were completed about 1290. During this era, three Roman Catholic orders established their convents in town (the Franciscan order established their domicile within the town wall at present-day Barfuesserkirche (the choir of which remains), the Dominican sisters order established their domicile outside the walls of the old town near Auer Bridge, and the Prediger cloister was located east of the Schlossberg, probably inside the town walls). Outside the town wall and across the Enz river, the suburb Flösser Quarters (the home of the timber-floating trade) was established. Next to the western town wall, the suburb of Brötzingen gradually developed.

The Margraves of Baden considered Pforzheim as their most important power base up to the first half of the 14th century. Under Margrave Bernard I (Bernhard I), Pforzheim became one of the administrative centers of the margraviate.

1322: Holy Ghost Hospital was founded at Tränk Street (present-day Deimling Street).

15th century
Various fraternities, also known as guilds, among people working in the same trade were established: The fraternity of tailors in 1410, the fraternity of bakers on 14 May 1422, the fraternity of the weavers in 1469, the fraternity of the wine-growers in 1491, the fraternity of the skippers and timber raftsmen in 1501, and the fraternity of the carters in 1512. Members of the same fraternity assisted each other in various ways, for example with funerals and in cases of sickness. In a sense, the fraternities were early forms of health and life insurance.

8–9 August 1418: Sigismund, Holy Roman Emperor visits Margrave Bernard I (Bernhard I) in Pforzheim. On this occasion the mint of the Margraves of Baden in Pforzheim was mentioned. Mint master was Jakob Broeglin between 1414–1431. The emperor appointed the master of the Pforzheim mint, Jakob Bröglin, and Bois von der Winterbach for five years as Royal Mint Masters of the mints of Frankfurt and Nördlingen. The Margrave was appointed as their patron.

1447: The wedding of Margrave Charles I (Karl I) of Baden with Katharina of Austria, the sister of Frederick III, Holy Roman Emperor (Friedrich III), was celebrated in Pforzheim with great pomp (including tournaments and dances).

1455: Johannes Reuchlin, the great German humanist, was born in Pforzheim on 29 January (he died in Stuttgart on 30 June 1522). He attended the Latin School section of the monastery school run by the Dominican order of Pforzheim in the late 1460s. Later, partly due to Reuchlin's efforts, the Latin School of Pforzheim developed into one of the most prominent schools in southwestern Germany, named Reuchlin-Gymnasium. The school's teachers and pupils played an outstanding role in the dissemination of the ideas of humanism and the protestant reformation movement. The most famous pupils included Reuchlin himself, Reuchlin's nephew Philipp Melanchthon, and Simon Grynaeus.

1460: Margrave Charles I established a kind of monastery (Kollegialstift) at the site of Schlosskirche St. Michael, turning the church into a collegiate church. There were also plans to establish a university in Pforzheim, but this plan had to be abandoned because Margrave Charles I lost the Battle of Seckenheim.

1463: Margrave Charles I was forced to transfer the palace and the town of Pforzheim as a fiefdom to the Elector Palatine after losing the Battle of Seckenheim. He then began to build a new palace in modern Baden-Baden. Christoph I, Margrave of Baden-Baden finally moved the residence of the margraves to Baden-Baden. This gradually ended the first period of Pforzheim's flourishment. The rich merchants gradually left the town, which declined to the status of a country town of mostly small traders.

1486: The Weavers Ordinance (Wollweberordnung) for the towns Pforzheim und Ettlingen was approved by Christoph I, Margrave of Baden-Baden. This was a contract concerning the town privileges of Pforzheim. This regulation of the weaving trade did not allow the formation of a regular guild (Zunft).

1491: A contract between Christoph I, Margrave of Baden-Baden and the citizens of Pforzheim was concluded, granting the town of Pforzheim several privileges concerning taxes and business.

1496: Foundation of the first printer's shop by Thomas Anshelm. During the first half of the 16th century Pforzheim's printers contributed significantly to the establishment of this (in those days) new medium.

16th century
1501: Christoph I, Margrave of Baden-Baden enacted the "Ordinance on the timber rafting profession in Pforzheim". The single timber logs that were floated from the deeper Black Forest areas down the Enz, Nagold and Wuerm rivers were bound together in the Au area to form larger timber rafts. Those rafts were then floated down the lower Enz, Neckar and Rhine rivers. The timber rafting stations of Weissenstein, Dillstein and Pforzheim were well known in the profession.

1501 was also the year for which an outbreak of the plague (probably the bubonic plague) is recorded in the Swabian chronicle Annalium Suevicorum by Eberhard Karls University of Tübingen professor Martin Grusius, published 1596. It is not known how many of Pforzheim's citizens died in that year, but there are reports of 500 deceased in the close-by city of Calw and about 4000 in Stuttgart, which accounted for approximately one quarter to one half of the populations of those towns. Outbreaks of the disease were reported for many places in southwestern Germany, Bohemia, the Alsace region in nowadays France, Switzerland, and Italy. Common graves with massive numbers of human bones at the cemetery of St. Michael Church and the cemetery on the estate of the Dominican order near nowadays Waisenhausplatz found during the last century may indicate that hundreds of citizens became the victims of the plague. There are indications that a fraternity for taking care of the sick and removing the bodies of the deceased from houses was formed in 1501, whose members later on stayed together and became known as the choral society Singergesellschaft, which is still active today as the Loebliche Singergesellschaft of 1501. (They are probably one of the oldest clubs in Europe).

1520s: The ideas of the protestant religious movement advanced by Martin Luther spread rapidly in Pforzheim. Its most prominent promoters were Johannes Schwebel, a preacher at Holy Ghost church (Heiliggeistkirche), and Johannes Unger, the principal of the Dominican Latin school.

1535–1565: Due to the heritage division of the clan of the Margraves of Baden, Margrave Ernst of Baden made Pforzheim the residential town of his family line. He decided to use the Schlosskirche St. Michael as the entombment site for his family line.

1549: A large fire caused severe damage to the town.

1556: After the conclusion of the Peace of Augsburg in 1555, Margrave Karl II introduced Lutherism (protestantism) as the state religion in the district Baden-Durlach, which included Pforzheim. The (Catholic) monasteries were gradually shut down.

1565: Margrave Karl II chose Durlach as the new residential town. Pforzheim stayed one of the administrative centers of Baden.

17th century
1618: At the beginning of the Thirty Years' War, the number of inhabitants of Pforzheim is estimated to have been between 2500 and 3000. This was the largest town among all towns in Baden, even though at that time it had already declined somewhat.

1645: Toward the end of the Thirty Years' War the "old town" was burned down by Bavarian (i.e. Catholic) troops. It was rebuilt, but without the former fortifications, which gave it the status of a village-like settlement. It soon vanished from historical records. The "new town" had survived.

1688–1697: The "War of the Palatinian Succession" (also called the Nine Years War) caused tremendous destruction in Southwestern Germany. The French "sun king" Louis XIV's efforts to expand the territory of France up to the Upper Rhine river and to put the Elector Palatine under pressure to severe its ties with the League of Augsburg included the Brûlez le Palatinat! tactics of destroying major towns on both sides of the Rhine river. These tactics seem to have been mainly the idea of the French war minister, François Michel le Tellier, Marquis de Louvois.

Pforzheim was occupied by French troops on 10 October 1688. Commanding officer is said to have been Joseph de Montclar. The town was forced to accommodate a large number of soldiers and had to pay a large amount of "contributions" to the French. When the army unit was about to depart early in the morning of 21 January 1689 (obviously because an army of the Holy Roman Empire had been approaching), they set many major buildings on fire, including the palais, the city hall, and vicarages. About 70 houses (i.e. one quarter of all houses) and part of the town's fortifications were reportedly destroyed.

Between 2 and 4 August, the French army under the general command of Marshal Jacques Henri de Durfort de Duras again crossed the Rhine river and began the destruction of major towns in Baden. On 10 August 1689, a French army unit under the command of General Ezéchiel du Mas, Comte de Mélac appeared in front of Pforzheims town gates, but this time the town refused to surrender. In response, the French army began shelling the town with cannons from the Rod hill located southwest of the town, and the several hundred soldiers of the German imperial command, who were defending the town, were forced to surrender. After a short period of looting, the French troops set the inner town area on fire on 15 August, which made that area uninhabitable for several weeks. Then the French moved on.

During the following two years, French troops stayed away from Pforzheim, but the economic situation of the town was miserable. In addition to this, the reconstruction of the town and the repairs of the fortifications under the supervision of Johann Matthaeus Faulhaber, the chief construction officer of the Margraviate Baden, required a lot of efforts. The accommodation of an imperial garrison under the command of (then) colonel Count Palffy also was a heavy burden.

In 1691, Louvois instructed his marshals to destroy those towns which were to serve as winter quarters for imperial troops, explicitly including Pforzheim, and then continue to Wuerttemberg for further destructions. After the French troops had crossed the Rhine river under the command of Marshal Guy Aldonce de Durfort de Lorges at Philippsburg on 3 August 1691, they assaulted the Margraves' residential town of Durlach and 1,200 cavalry men, 300 dragoons and 1,200 infantry men advanced toward Pforzheim where they arrived in the morning on 9 August and surrounded the town. When the approximately 200 imperial soldiers under the command of Captain Zickwolf and other men in the town refused to surrender, the siege began. After shelling the town during the day and the following night, the resistance of the town broke down and on 10 August in the morning the French forced the town gates open, occupied and looted it (although with little success, as there was not much left to be taken away). On 12 August, the French moved on, this time refraining from setting houses on fire. The fortification had again been damaged, though (the White Tower, the Auer Bridge Gate, the Upper Mill and the Nonnen Mill were burnt down). The French also stole all church bells, except for one minor one.

On 20 September 1692, again crossed the Rhine river under the general command of Marshal Guy Aldonce de Durfort de Lorges, and advanced toward Durlach and Pforzheim. On 24 September, 2,000 cavalry soldiers and 1,200 infantry and artillery troops under the command of Marshal Noël Bouton de Chamilly, moved to Pforzheim, where the town and 600 soldiers of the imperial German army in town surrendered without any military engagements. The rest of the French army arrived on 27 September under the command of Marshal de Lorges. On the same day, the French army moved on to Oetisheim near Mühlacker and attacked an imperial army unit of 4,000 cavalry men under the command of Duke Frederick Charles of Württemberg-Winnental in their camp. As they were taken by surprise, they withdrew hastily and lost several hundred men, either killed or captured by the French. (The Duke himself was among the French prisoners.) On 28 September, the French army returned to Pforzheim and established a camp. It was reported that the entire Enz valley between the village of Eutingen east of Pforzheim and the village of Birkenfeld west of Pforzheim was occupied by the 30,000 French soldiers' camps. From their base in Pforzheim, French army units obviously under the leadership of Marshal de Chamilly advanced along the river valleys of Nagold and Würm and looted and destroyed the villages and towns of Huchenfeld, Calw, Hirsau, Liebenzell and Zavelstein. They also destroyed Liebeneck castle about 10 kilometres from Pforzheim towering above the Würm valley, where part of the Pforzheim town archives were hidden. The archive was burned. Another part of the town archive as well as documents of Baden administrative office had been brought to Calw, where they went up in flames, too.

When the French troops left after about one week of occupation, they again looted Pforzheim and put it on fire. This time, all houses which had survived the two previous fires, were destroyed. In the Au suburb, only three houses survived. The Au bridge was heavily damaged. Only four houses survived in the Broetzingen suburb. The town church of St. Stephen and a large part of the Dominican monastery complex were also destroyed. The Castle Church (Schlosskirche) of St. Michael was heavily damaged, and the family tombs of the Margraves of Baden in the church were desecrated by the soldiers. The last remaining church bell and the churches' clockworks were stolen as well. The town wall was damaged again, including the town gates. After the week-long presence of 30,000 soldiers in a town of only a few thousand citizens, all food was gone, including the seeds saved for next spring's sowing season. Every tree and grapevine on the valley slopes had been used up as firewood. The French army reached their camp in Philippsburg on 5 October 1692.

18th century
1718: Inauguration of the "institution for orphans, the mad, the sick, for discipline and work" in a building of the former Dominican order Convent by the Enz river. Fifty years later this institution was to become the incubator of Pforzheim's jewellery and watchmaking industries.

1715–1730: During this period, there was a prolonged dispute between Pforzheim's citizens and the Margrave of Baden concerning the privileges granted to the town in 1491, which the Margrave considered obsolete and therefore demanded significantly higher tax payments from Pforzheim citizens. The issue was taken all the way to the Imperial Court of Justice, where the town's motion was defeated.

1767: Establishment of a watch and jewellery factory in the orphanage. This led to Pforzheim's jewellery industries. Watchmaking was given up later on.

19th century
1805–06: A typhus epidemic in Pforzheim caused many deaths, disrupting the town's economy.

1809: The Administrative District Pforzheim of Baden was split into a Municipal District Administration Pforzheim and two Rural Districts.

1813: The two Rural Districts were combined to form the Rural District Administration Pforzheim.

1819: Municipal District Pforzheim and Rural District Pforzheim are merged to form the Higher District Administration Pforzheim.

1836: Ferdinand Öchsle in Pforzheim invented a device for measuring the sugar content in freshly pressed grape juice for assessing the future quality of wine (Mostwaage). It is still in use in the winery business.

1861–62: Pforzheim was connected to the German railway network with the completion of a section of the Karlsruhe–Mühlacker line between Wilferdingen and Pforzheim.

1863: The railway section between Pforzheim and Mühlacker was completed, thus establishing railway traffic between the capital of Baden, Karlsruhe, and the capital of Württemberg, Stuttgart.

1864: The Higher District Administration Pforzheim was made the Regional Administration Pforzheim.

1868: The Enz Valley Railway between Pforzheim and Wildbad was completed.

1869: Establishment of the first workers' union in Pforzheim, the "Pforzheim Gold(-metal) Craftsmen's Union".

1874: The section of the Nagold Valley Railway between Pforzheim and Calw was completed.

1877: Inauguration of the Arts and Crafts School (Kunstgewerbeschule; now incorporated into Hochschule (University) Pforzheim).

1888: Bertha Benz and her two sons arrived in Pforzheim on the first "long-distance" drive in the history of the automobile in a car manufactured by her husband Carl Benz in order to visit relatives. The very first gasoline-powered automobile with an internal combustion engine of the inventor had hit the roads only two years earlier after a patent for this new technology had been granted to Karl Benz on 29 January 1886. She bought the gasoline necessary for her trip back home in a "pharmacy" in Pforzheim. During the trip, Bertha Benz had to make repairs with a hairpin to open a blocked fuel line, and after returning home, suggested to her husband that another gear be provided in his automobile for climbing hills. To commemorate this first long-distance journey by automobile, the Bertha Benz Memorial Route was officially approved as a route of industrial heritage of mankind in 2008.

1893: Inauguration of the Pforzheim Synagogue.

The company Wellendorff, a family-owned jewellery producing until now, is founded by Ernst Alexander Wellendorff. The enterprise sells many kinds of jewelry at the highest level worldwide.

20th century
From 1900: Revival of the Pforzheim watchmaking industry.

1905: The western borough Brötzingen was incorporated into the administration Pforzheim.

1906: The 1. FC Pforzheim football club was defeated by VfB Leipzig with a score of 1–2 in the final game of the German football championship.

1907: Julius Epple founded Aristo, the watch brand, benefitting from the bull market for wristwatches in the 1920s.

1914–1918: Pforzheim was not a battlefield in World War I, but 1600 men from Pforzheim lost their lives as soldiers on the battlefields.

1920s: The Pforzheim watchmaking industry thrived due to the new popularity of wrist-watches.

1927: Stowa, another well-known German watch brand from Pforzheim, was founded by Walter Storz in Hornberg, moving the business to Pforzheim in 1935. Walter's son, Werner, eventually takes over the business. 

From 1933: Along with the installation of the Nazi government in Germany the local subsidiaries of all political parties, groups and organizations other than the NSDAP were gradually disbanded in town. Public life as well as individual affairs were increasingly affected by Nazi influences. Persecution of Jewish fellow citizens occurred in Pforzheim, too, with boycotts of Jewish shops and companies.

1938: Establishment of the municipal Jewellery Museum.

1938: On 9 November, the so-called Kristallnacht, the Pforzheim Synagogue (see WWW-site) of the Jewish community was so badly damaged by Nazi activists that it had to be demolished later on.

1939: Regional Administration Pforzheim (Bezirksamt) was converted to the Rural District Pforzheim (Landkreis) with Pforzheim city as its administrative site. However, the town itself became a district-less administrative body.

1940: Deportation of Jewish citizens of Pforzheim to the concentration camp in Gurs (France). Only 55 of the 195 deported persons escaped from the holocaust.

World War II

In 1944, many factories were converted to produce weaponry such as anti-aircraft shells, fuses for bombs, and allegedly even parts for the V-1 and V-2 rockets.

On the evening of 23 February 1945, Pforzheim was bombed in one of the most devastating area bombardments of World War II. Carried out by the Royal Air Force, the air raid killed about one quarter of the town's population, over 17,000 people, and destroyed about 83% of the town's buildings. The mission order to bomb Pforzheim issued by RAF Bomber Command states as the intention of the raid on Pforzheim "to destroy built up area and associated industries and rail facilities". The bombardment was carried out as part of the British carpet bombing campaign. The town was put on the target list for bombardments in November 1944 because it was thought by the Allies to be producing precision instruments for use in the German war effort and as transport centre for the movement of German troops.

There were also several minor raids in 1944 and 1945.

After the main attack, about 30,000 people had to be fed by makeshift public kitchens because their housing had been destroyed. Almost 90% of the buildings in the core city area had been destroyed. Many Pforzheim citizens were buried in mass graves at Pforzheim's main cemetery because they could not be identified. There are also many graves of complete families. Among the dead were several hundred foreigners who had been in Pforzheim as forced labor workers.

The inner-city districts were severely depopulated. According to the State Statistics Bureau (Statistisches Landesamt), in the Market Square area (Marktplatzviertel) in 1939 there were 4,112 registered inhabitants, in 1945 none (0). In the Old Town area (Altstadtviertel) in 1939 there were 5,109 inhabitants, in 1945 only three persons were still living there. In the Leopold Square area, in 1939 there were 4,416 inhabitants, in 1945 only 13.

The German Army Report of 24 February 1945 devoted only two lines to reporting the bombardment: "In the early evening hours of February 23, a forceful British attack was directed at Pforzheim." RAF Bomber Command later assessed the bombing raid as the one with "probably the greatest proportion (of destroyed built-up area) (of any target) in one raid during the war".

In early April, as the Allied forces and notably the French Army advanced toward Pforzheim, the local German military commander gave orders to destroy the electric power generating plant and those gas and water supply lines that were still working, but local residents succeeded in persuading the staff sergeant in charge of the operation to refrain from this action in the face of the imminent and seemingly inevitable surrender of the German military. Likewise, orders were issued for the destruction of those bridges that had remained unscathed (some of the bridges had been destroyed by the air strikes of 23 February, others damaged or destroyed earlier in the war). Only the Iron (Railway) Bridge in Weißenstein ward was saved by citizens who pulled off the fuse wiring from the explosive devices which had already been installed, and dropped it into Nagold river. On 8 April, French troops, including an armored vehicle unit, moved into Pforzheim from the northwest, and were able to occupy the area north of Enz river, but the area south of the Enz river was defended by a German infantry unit using artillery. Fighting was especially fierce in Broetzingen. The French army units (including an Algerian and Moroccan unit) suffered heavy losses; among the dead was the commander of the army unit, Capitaine Dorance. The advance of the French army came to a halt temporarily, but with the support of fighter-bomber aircraft and due to the bad condition of the defenders - which included many old men and young boys who had been drafted into the Volkssturm - the French troops took possession of the vast rubble field which once was the a residential town of the Baden Margraves on 18 April.

The three months of French occupation were reportedly marked by hostile attitudes on both the French army side and the Pforzheim population's side; incidents of rape and looting, mainly by Moroccan soldiers, were also reported. Au Bridge (Auerbruecke) and Wuerm Bridge received makeshift repairs by the French military. The US Army, which replaced the French troops on 8 July 1945, helped repair Goethe Bridge, Benckiser Bridge, Old Town Bridge (Altstädterbrücke) and Horse Bridge (Roßbrücke) in 1945 and the following year. The relationship between the population and the US military was reportedly more relaxed than had been the case with the French army.

Post-World War II
1945–1965: Pforzheim was gradually rebuilt, giving Pforzheim a quite modern look. In September 1951 the Northern Town Bridge (Nordstadtbrücke) was inaugurated (the ceremony was attended by then Federal President Prof. Dr. Theodor Heuss). Jahn Bridge followed in December 1951, Werder Bridge in May 1952, the rebuilt Goethe Bridge in October 1952, and the rebuilt Old Town Bridge was inaugurated in 1954.

1955: On the occasion of the 500th birthday anniversary of Johannes Reuchlin, the city of Pforzheim established the Reuchlin Prize and awarded it for the first time in the presence of then President of the Federal Republic of Germany (West-Germany), Prof. Dr. Theodor Heuss.

1961: Inauguration of the culture center "Reuchlinhaus", which from then on housed the Jewellery Museum, the Arts and Crafts Association, the City Library, the Homeland Museum (Heimatmuseum), and the City Archives.

1968: On 10 July shortly before 22:00, Pforzheim and its surrounding areas were hit by a rare tornado. It was rated F4 on the Fujita scale. Two persons died under a collapsing wall in nearby Ottenhausen and more than 200 were injured, and 1750 buildings were damaged. Across the town between Buechenbronn ward and the village of Wurmberg the storm caused severe damage to forest areas (i.e. most trees fell to the ground). During the first night and the following days the soldiers of the French 3rd Husar Regiment and the US Army Unit, which were still stationed at the Buckenberg Barracks, helped clear the streets of a lot of fallen trees (especially in the Buckenberg/Haidach area). It took about four weeks to carry out the most necessary repairs on buildings. The overhead electric contact wires for the electric trolley buses then still operating in town and the streetcar transport system to the village of Ittersbach were never repaired; those transport systems were retired.

1971–1975: The townships of Würm, Hohenwart, Buechenbronn, Huchenfeld and Eutingen were incorporated into the city administration.

1973: Inauguration of the new Pforzheim City Hall.

1973 As part of the reform of administrative districts, the rural district of Pforzheim was incorporated into the newly established Enz rural district, which has its administration in Pforzheim. But the city of Pforzheim itself remains a district-less city. In addition, Pforzheim became the administrative center of the newly formed Northern Black Forest Region.

1975 On 1 January, the population exceeded 100.000 and Pforzheim gained the status of a "large city" (Grossstadt).

1979: Inauguration of the Pforzheim City Museum.

1983: Inauguration of the "Technical Museum of the Jewellery and Watchmaking Industry" and the "Citizens Museum".

1987: Inauguration of the City Convention Center.

1987/1990: Inauguration of the City Theater at the Waisenhausplatz.

1989: Sister City agreement with the City of Gernika, Spain.

1990: Sister City agreement with the City of Saint-Maur-des-Fossés, France.

1991: Sister City agreement with the City of Vicenza, Italy.

1992: State Gardening Expo in Pforzheim. Enzauenpark was created and part of the Enz river was re-naturalized.

1994: Inauguration of the cultural institution "Kulturhaus Osterfeld".

1994: Merger of the Pforzheim Business School and the Pforzheim School of Design to form the Pforzheim University of Applied Sciences in Design, Technology and Business.

1995: Inauguration of the Archeological Site Kappelhof.

21st century
2000: Inauguration of the Pforzheim Gallery.

2002: In November, during excavation works for a new shopping center in the center of the city, a power shovel hit a  bomb that had not detonated during the bombardment of 1945. On a Sunday, about 5000 citizens temporarily left their homes as a precaution while specialists defused and disposed of the latest of a large number of unexploded bombs found in Pforzheim's grounds since 1945.

2006: The Timex Group introduced a line of high-end watches engineered in Pforzheim over a five-year period, to six sigma standards. The technology used miniaturization with digital sensors and microprocessors driving independent motors and dial hands — to enable a range of specialized complications atypical to non-digital, analog watches — an array of functions that would either be impossible or highly impractical in a mechanical movement.

Demographics

Administrative unions
Formerly independent communities and districts which were incorporated into the City of Pforzheim.

Population
The table below shows the number of inhabitants for the past 500 years. Until 1789 the numbers represent estimates, after that they represent census results or official recordings by the Statistics Offices or the city administration.

The population growth diagram show that the largest growth rates were recorded between about 1830 and 1925, which was the period following the political reorganisation of Europe agreed upon at the Vienna Congress of 1815 after the violent period that was so much dominated by Napoleon Bonaparte of France. This high population growth period coincided with the period of intensive industrialisation of Germany. Population growth weakened due to the effects of World War I and World War II. The population declined sharply due to the destruction on 23 February 1945, and increased sharply in the post-World War II era due to high economic growth levels in West-Germany and the rapid rebuilding efforts in Pforzheim. Earlier setbacks were recorded during the Thirty Years' War period in the 17th century.

Immigration
The table below lists the largest immigrant groups of Pforzheim .

Religions
After margrave Karl II of Baden in 1556 installed the Protestant Reformation in the Margraviate of Baden, of which Pforzheim was the capital in those days, Pforzheim continued to be a Protestant town for several centuries. The congregations in Pforzheim were affiliated with the deanery (Dekanat) of Pforzheim of the Protestant National Church of Baden, unless they were members of one of the independent churches (Freikirche).

Since the 19th century at the latest Catholics settled in Pforzheim again. They are affiliated with the deanery of Pforzheim, which belongs to the Archdiocese of Freiburg.

Other denominations and religious sects in Pforzheim are:
 Israelite Congregation
 Islamic Congregation
 Adventist Congregation
 Jehovah's Witnesses
 Baptist Church
 Salvation Army
 Methodist Church
 Church of Christ, Scientist

Politics

City council
The city council of Pforzheim consists of the Lord Mayor as its president and 40 elected (part-time) councillors. It is democratically elected by the citizens for a period of five years. The last election was on 25 May 2014. The city council is the main representative body of the city and determines the goals and frameworks for all local political activities. It makes decisions about all important issues regarding the public life and administration of the city and directs and monitors the work of the
city administration. It forms expert committees in order to deal with
specialized issues.

City administration
The city administration is led by the Lord Mayor (presently Gert Hager) and three Mayors (presently Alexander Uhlig, Roger Heidt and Monika Mueller). The administration consists of four departments (Dezernat) which are in charge of the following areas:

Department I: Personnel, finances, business development, general
administration. (Managed by Gerd Hager.)

Department II: Construction and planning, environment. (Managed by Alexander Uhlig.)

Department III: Education, culture, social affairs, sports. (Managed by Monika Mueller.)

Department IV: Security and public order, health, energy and water supply, local transportation and traffic. (Managed by Roger Heidt.)

Lord mayors
At an early stage, the town administration was led by the mayor (Schultheiss) who used to be appointed by the lord (owner) of the town. Later on, there was a council with a mayor leading it, who since 1849 holds the title "Lord Mayor". The terms of office of the mayors until 1750 are unknown. Only the names of the mayors are mentioned in historical documents.

The coat of arms

The coat of arms of Pforzheim city shows in the left-hand half of a shield an inclined bar in red color on a golden background, and the right-hand half is divided into four fields in the colors red, silver, blue and gold. The city flag is white-blue.

The inclined bar can be traced back to the 13th century as the symbol of the lords (owners) of Pforzheim, which later on also became the National Coat of Arms of Baden, but its meaning is unknown. Since 1489 the coat of arms in its entire form can be verified, but its meaning is not known, either. Current coloring has been used only since 1853; in earlier times the coloring was different.

Economy and infrastructure
Pforzheim is one of the regional centers (Oberzentrum) in Baden-Württemberg and has one of the highest densities of industrial activity in the state.

Pforzheim is historically an important jewelry and watch-making centre in Germany. Due to this reason, Pforzheim is nicknamed as Golden City. Jewelry and watch-making industry is first set up by Jean François Autran after receiving an edict from then overlord Margrave Karl Friedrich von Baden. This enterprise is later joined by other commercial enterprises and helped Pforzheim to become an important manufacturing city. Pforzheim accounts for just under 70 percent of the total sales of the German jewelry and silverware industry and around 80 percent of all the pieces of jewelry exported by Germany come from Pforzheim.

However, a smaller fraction of the economy nowadays is dedicated to producing the traditional products of watches and jewellery. Only 11,000 people are employed in the jewelry and watch-making industries. Two thirds of all employment positions are made available in the areas of metal processing, dental industry electronics and electro-technology. The mail order companies (Bader, Klingel, Wenz) with their sales volumes in the order of millions of Euros occupies a leading position in Germany. Tourism is gaining importance. In this respect the city benefits from its favorable Three-Valleys location at the gateway to the Black Forest, and related to this, from the starting points of a large number of hiking, cycling and waterway routes. The European long-distance trail E1 passes through Pforzheim. It is also the starting point of the Black Forest Hiking Routes Westweg, Mittelweg and Ostweg.

Traffic
The Federal Freeway A8 (Perl–Bad Reichenhall) runs by just to the north of the city. The city can be accessed via four freeway exits. The Interstate Road B10 (Lebach–Augsburg) and B294 (Gundelfingen–Bretten) run through the city. The B463 Interstate Road running toward Nagold has its starting point here.

Pforzheim Hauptbahnhof (central station) is located on the Karlsruhe–Mühlacker line, connecting to Stuttgart. In addition there are two railway lines into the Black Forest: the Enz Valley Railway to Bad Wildbad and the Nagold Valley Railway to Nagold. Pforzheim is connected to the Karlsruhe Light Rail network. Other public transportation services in the city area are provided by buses of the Pforzheim Municipal Transport, subsidiary of Veolia Transport Company (SVP) and several other transportation companies. They all offer unified fares within the framework of the Pforzheim-Enzkreis Verkehrsverbund.

Between 1931 and 1968 a light rail connection existed between Ittersbach and Pforzheim, operated by Pforzheim Municipal Transportation Company (SVP). Before that (since 1899) the railroad belonged to the BLEAG (Baden Local Railway Inc., Badische-Lokaleisenbahn-Aktiengesellschaft). The only remaining light rail service "S 5" connecting Pforzheim to Bietigheim-Bissingen, Karlsruhe and Wörth am Rhein is operated by Albtal-Verkehrs-Gesellschaft (Albtal Transportation Company), which since 2002 also operates the Enz Valley Light Rail route to Bad Wildbad.

Major local enterprises
 Wellendorff Gold-Creationen GmbH & Co. KG, worldwide selling, family-owned jewellery since 1893
 Victor Mayer GmbH & Co. KG, Workmaster of Fabergé
 Amazon, logistics centre
 Durowe, watch movement manufacturer
 Schmid Machine Tools
 Klingel Mail Order Company
 Bader Mail Order Company
 Wenz Mail Order Company
 Witzenmann GmbH (Specialized Metal Goods)
 Mapal WWS
 Thales (Electronics)
 Allgemeine Gold- und Silberscheideanstalt (metal processing)
 Sparkasse Pforzheim Calw (Local financial services company)
 Bernhard Forster GmbH (Forestadent) (Orthodontic Products Manufacturer)

Media
The daily newspapers Pforzheimer Zeitung, (independent) and the Pforzheimer Kurier, which is a regional edition of Badische Neueste Nachrichten (BNN) with main editorial offices in Karlsruhe, are published in Pforzheim.

Courts of Justice
Pforzheim is the site of a Local Court of Justice, which belongs to the District Court and Higher District Court Precinct of Karlsruhe. It is also the domicile of a local labor court.

Authorities
Pforzheim is the domicile of the following public authorities and public incorporated bodies:
 Pforzheim Employment Exchange (a federal government agency; Arbeitsagentur Pforzheim).
 Pforzheim Internal Revenue Agency (a state agency; Finanzamt Pforzheim)
 Northern Black Forest Chamber of Commerce (a public incorporated body; IHK Nordschwarzwald). The precinct of the chamber is the Northern Black Forest Region.
 Northern Black Forest Regional Association (a public incorporated body; Regionalverband Nordschwarzwald).

Educational institutions
 Pforzheim University of Applied Sciences (Hochschule Pforzheim – Hochschule fuer Gestaltung, Technik und Wirtschaft) enrolls about 5400 students. It was formed in 1992 by way of merging the former Pforzheim School of Design (Fachhochschule fuer Gestaltung) and Pforzheim Business School (Fachhochschule fuer Wirtschaft) and additionally establishing the Faculty of Engineering. The Pforzheim School of Design had its roots in the Ducal Academy of Arts and Crafts and Technical School for the Metal Processing Industry, established 1877. The Pforzheim Business School was the successor institution of the National Business College, which was established in 1963. The campuses of the Faculty of Design and the Faculties of Economics and Engineering are located at separate sites in the city area. The Pforzheim University of Applied Sciences fosters international exchange. Among other relationships, it is affiliated with the NIEBES Association and has close academic ties to Osijek University of Croatia and academic exchange programs with many institutions abroad, among them Auburn University, the University of Wyoming, Brigham Young University and the Illinois Institute of Technology, in Chicago, of the United States of America.
 The Goldsmith and Watchmaking Vocational School is the one of the two schools of its kind in Europe. It is attended by many students from abroad.
 The general qualification for university admission (Abitur) can be obtained through an education at the Reuchlin-Highschool, the Kepler-Highschool, the Hebel-Highschool, the Theodor-Heuss-Highschool, the Hilda-Highschool, the Schiller-Highschool, the Fritz-Erler-Highschool (economics-oriented high school), the Heinrich-Wieland-Highschool (technology-oriented high school), the Johanna-Wittum-Highschool (home economics-oriented high school), as well as the Waldorfschule.
 Pforzheim also has many schools providing the mandatory general elementary and secondary education (Grundschule, Realsc) as well an institution which is dedicated to further education of grown-ups (Volkshochschule). There are also several state-run vocational schools leading to professional diplomas in the crafts and trades.

Culture and places of interest

Theatre
 Municipal Theatre of Pforzheim (opera, operetta, dance, musical, drama)

Orchestras
 Pforzheim Chamber Orchestra – This orchestra was founded by Friedrich Tilegant in 1950. It participated in the world premiere of a work of Boris Blacher and has a good reputation beyond the region.
 Symphony Orchestra of the City of Pforzheim

Museums
 Archeological Site Kappelhof – Roman and medieval excavation objects
 Civic Museum Eutingen
 Museum on the German Democratic Republic (former east Germany)
 The Center of Fellow-Countrymen Associations (Landsmannschaften; especially those from eastern Europe)
 The Pforzheim Minerals Museum
 The Pforzheim Gallery (paintings)
 Reuchlinhaus
 The Pforzheim Jewellery Museum in the Reuchlinhaus
 The Pforzheim City Museum Pforzheim (on city history)
 The Technical Museum of the Jewellery and Watchmaking Industry of Pforzheim
 Weissenstein Station – On Railway History in the area of Pforzheim
 Roman Estate in the Kanzlerwald (the excavated remains of an estate built by Roman settlers)
 The Product Exhibition of Pforzheim (jewellery) Companies (Industriehaus)
 The Exhibition of Precious Stones by Widow Mrs. Schuett

Cultural institutions
 The House of Culture Osterfeld (a sociocultural center: theater, music, dance, cabaret, musical, arts, exhibitions etc.)
 Kupferdaechle (The Copper Roof Teenage Culture Center)
 The Puppet Theater of Raphael Muerle / The Marionette Stage Mottenkaefig
 The Communal Cinema of Pforzheim
 CongressCenter Pforzheim (CCP)
 City Library

Notable examples of architecture

Pre-war
 The Archive Building (Archivbau)
 The House of Industry (Industriehaus)
 The Arch Bridge at Dillweißenstein
 The ruins of Liebeneck Castle
 District office tower (Bezirksamtsturm)
 Leitgastturm
 Seehaus (formerly a hunting villa of the Margrave; now a popular destination for Sunday afternoon walks away from the city)
 The Old Grapes Press of Brötzingen
 Hachel Tower
 The Copper Hammer (Kupferhammer; a traditional water-powered sledge hammer which was used for metal forming)

Post-war
 
 The Main Railway Station
 The former main post office and Brötzingen post office
 Reuchlinhaus
 Goldener Adler Building at Leopoldplatz
 former Public Health Authority building (Gesundheitsamt) at Blumenhof
 District Court Building
 The Old and New City Hall
 Stadtbau Building (Architect: Luigi Snozzi)
 Sparkasse Tower
 Churches:
 The Palais and Monastery Church St. Michael (Schloss- und Stiftskirche); it is the city's landmark.
 The Old Town Church St. Martin (Altstadtkirche; Protestant)
 Resurrection Church (Auferstehungskirche; Protestant)
 The Bare Feet Church (Barfüsserkirche; Catholic)
 Christ Church of Brötzingen (Protestant)
 The Protestant City Church (Stadtkirche)
 Sacred Heart Church (Herz-Jesu-Kirche; Catholic)
 St. Matthew Church (Matthäuskirche; Protestant). This church was designed by architect Eiermann and is a precursory structure of the famous New Berlin Memorial Church (Gedächtniskirche)
 St. Francis Church (Catholic)
 Other Temples
 The Islamic Mosque
 The notable New Synagogue (1890) was lost on Kristallnacht

Other sites of interest
 The Alpengarten Pforzheim, closed since 2006
 The Main Cemetery (Hauptfriedhof)
 Wallberg. The debris from the destroyed town (23 February 1945) was dumped onto this hill. The Wallberg-Monument on the top is meant to remind people of the city's history; it was erected in 2005 on the occasion of the 60th anniversary of the bombing raid.
 The Game Animals Zoo (Wildpark Pforzheim)
 Brötzingen Valley Stadium. This is the classical soccer stadium of the 1. FC Pforzheim soccer club of 1896, which was inaugurated in 1913. It accommodated a record number of "15.000 to 20.000" spectators on the occasion of the match between South Germany against Central Hungary in 1920. In the post-Second-World-War era it accommodated 12.000 spectators at the cup matches 1. FC Pforzheim – 1. FC Nürnberg (score 2–1 after extra time; 1961) and 1. FCP – Werder Bremen (score 1–1 after extension; 1988). The soccer club (simply called the "club"), which during its history supplied the first national team captain and a total of eleven first league players, had to file for bankruptcy in February 2004 and for the first time in history is playing in the fifth league, i.e. the Soccer Association's Northern Baden League, during the 2004–05 season. In 1906, the club lost the final of the German Football Championship against VfB Leipzig 1–2 in Nuremberg.
 The Weststadtpark in the borough Maihälden, an extensive park area

Twin towns and sister cities

Pforzheim is twinned with:

  Gernika-Lumo, Spain (1989)
  Saint-Maur-des-Fossés, France (1989)
  Vicenza, Italy (1991)
  Irkutsk, Russia (2007)
  Nevşehir, Turkey (2007)
  Częstochowa, Poland (2007)
  Győr-Moson-Sopron, Hungary (2007)
  Osijek, Croatia (2008)

Notable people

 Johannes Reuchlin (1455–1522), humanist and philosopher
 Nikolaus Gerbel (1485–1560), humanist and jurist
 Philipp Jakob Becker (1763–?), painter
 Christopher Bechtler (1782–1843), gold smith and mechanician
 Karl Heinrich Baumgaertner (1798–1886), pathologist
 Christian Friedrich Wilhelm Roller (1802–1878), psychiatrist 
 Bertha Benz (1849–1944), wife of Karl Benz
 Victor Mayer (1857–1946), entrepreneur
 Guillermo Kahlo (1871–1941), father of Frida Kahlo
 Heinrich Otto Wieland (1877–1957), chemist, Nobel Prize laureate
 Erich Rothacker (1888–1965), philosopher and sociologist
 Fritz Todt (1891–1942), engineer and head of Organisation Todt
 Julius Moser (1882–1970), entrepreneur
 Erich Rothacker (1888–1965), philosopher and sociologist
 Robert Faas (1889–1914), footballer
 Emil Georg Bührle (1890–1956), Swiss industrialist
 Marius Hiller (1892–1964), footballer
 Hans Ferdinand Mayer (1895–1980), physicist and electrical engineer
 Hellmut Maneval (1898–1967), footballer
 Karl Abt (1899–1985), painter
 Adolf Rosenberger (1900–1967), race car driver and merchant
 Theodor Burkhardt (1905–1958), footballer
 Fritz Dietrich (1905–1945), musicologist and composer
 Hans Henninger (1905–1937), stage and film actor
 Leah Horowitz (1933–1956), Israeli hurdler
 Laura Perls (1905–1990), psychoanalyst
 Herbert Witzenmann (1905–1988), writer and researcher
 Wolfgang Preisendanz (1920–2007), Germanist and literary scholar
 Fritz Rau (1930–2013), concert manager
 Werner Tochtermann (1934–2021), chemist and university lecturer
 Manfred Mohr (born 1938), artist, pioneer of the digital art
 Jochen Hasenmayer (born 1941), cave diver
 Wolfgang Heinz (born 1942), criminologist and legal scientist
 Dieter Kosslick (born 1948), director of the Berlinale Film Festival
 Peter Bofinger (born 1954), economist and a former member of the German Council of Economic Experts
 Tomas Maier (born 1957), fashion designer
 Jürgen Elsässer (born 1957), journalist and political activist
 Stefan Mappus (born 1966), economist and politician (CDU)
 Oliver Forster (born 1968), sports commentator and moderator
 Jan Kopp (born 1971), composer, musicologist and publicist
 Florian Ross (born 1972), composer, jazz pianist and bandleader
 Philipp Mohr (born 1972), German-American architect and designer 
 Marcello Craca (born 1974), German-Italian tennis player
 Logan McCree (born 1977), DJ and pornographic actor; birth name "Philipp Tanzer"
 Nicola Thost (born 1977), snowboarder and Olympic champion
 Jeff S. Klotz (born 1990), Author, publisher, museum director and entrepreneur
 Vincenzo Grifo (born 1993), footballer
 Robin Hack (born 1998), footballer

Honorary citizens
 1939 Alfons Kern, historian
 1965 Johann Peter Brandenburg, politician (FDP/DVP), Member of State Parliament, Lord Mayor of Pforzheim
 1985 Willi Weigelt, politician (SPD), Lord Mayor of Pforzheim
 1991 Richard Ziegler, painter
 1998 Rolf Schweizer, church music director

Miscellaneous topics
 The Freemasons Lodge "Reuchlin" is located in Pforzheim.
 Fool's Garden, an internationally successful rock band, has its origins in Pforzheim.

Gallery

References

Citations

Notes

External links

 
 Pforzheim as a destination - Presented in travel magazine
 

 
Baden
Cities in Baden-Württemberg
Holocaust locations in Germany
Karlsruhe (region)